Premier Street Sewer Vent and Cottages is a heritage-listed sewer vent and cottages at 24 and 26 Premier Street, Marrickville, Inner West Council, New South Wales, Australia. It was designed by the New South Wales Public Works Department, which built it from 1898 to 1900. It was added to the New South Wales State Heritage Register on 15 November 2002.

History 
The stack was built by the Public Works Department on the Metropolitan Water Sewerage & Drainage Board's behalf as part of the Western Suburbs Sewerage Scheme, put into service 1898-1900. The steel access door in the base of the stack opens to step-irons leading down to the penstock chamber below. The chamber is the junction of three sewer mains, the Eastern Main Branch (reticulating Marrickville, Petersham, Newtown, Leichhardt, Annandale & Camperdown), the Northern Main Branch (reticulating Marrickville, Petersham, Annandale, Leichhardt & Ashfield) and the Western Main Branch (reticulating Ashfield, Burwood, Drummoyne, Strathfield, Concord and Homebush). The Outfall Main originally led to the sewage farm at Rockdale, but from 1916 has been connected to the Southern and Western Suburbs Ocean Outfall Sewer (SWSOOS), terminating at the Long Bay treatment works at Malabar.

A large crack in the vent was also repaired at the same time.

The cottages were sold by Sydney Water in 2018.

Description 
A pair of Queen Anne Revival workers cottages flank the 1898 brick sewer vent stack, which is sited amongst detached late Victorian and turn of the 20th century dwellings. The cottages form part of a fairly diverse architectural character streetscape, many of which are substantially intact, although late 20th century alterations have affected a few dwellings in the immediate visual catchment.

The brick stack is constructed of moulded bricks, with an overall classical proportion, detailing and entasis to the shaft. The shaft is presently fitted with steel bands as extra support fitted in the late 20th century. It appears as though a concrete band towards the capital of the shaft is a mid to late 20th century alteration but that is to be confirmed.

The construction of the cottages is load bearing brick in English bond with original timber joinery including: windows, doors, turned timber verandah posts and boarded verandah ends, Marseilles pattern terracotta tiles, brick chimneys and terracottag chimney pots. Internally the cottages are also substantially intact retaining much of their original finishes and joinery. The front fence is a conservation of the original.

No. 24 is the western cottage to the vent shaft. The lattice in the front garden of no. 24 is from the late 20th century.

In the early 1990s the two cottages were subject to a high quality programme of conservation works including authentic colour scheme which survives today.

The cottages and vent shaft are integral to the streetscape characteristics of the immediate area, and are in themselves excellent examples of their type, design and construction from that period.

Both the cottages and the shaft are substantially intact and are still used for their original purposes as dwellings and vent shaft although not necessarily as workers cottages from the Water Board. This is in itself a rarity in Sydney Water's system.

The vent shaft is a landmark particularly from the south west to the south eastern areas, as it is sited in an elevated position towards the southern side of the rise.

Heritage listing 
A rare, if not unique, combination of Queen Anne revival brick Water Board cottages and sewer vent exhibiting excellent qualities of the brick and stonemasons craft, the likes of which are not probable to be reproduced again.

Sewer Vent and Cottages was listed on the New South Wales State Heritage Register on 15 November 2002 having satisfied the following criteria.

The place is important in demonstrating the course, or pattern, of cultural or natural history in New South Wales.

The cottages are tangible reminders of the historical importance employees were valued at the time of its construction. The vent stack historically is strategically placed at the junction of the western main sewer branches.

The place is important in demonstrating aesthetic characteristics and/or a high degree of creative or technical achievement in New South Wales.

The vent stack is a prominent landmark within the area surrounding the cottages. The cottages and vent stack in themselves make a high quality contribution to the residential streetscape of Premier Street.

The place has strong or special association with a particular community or cultural group in New South Wales for social, cultural or spiritual reasons.

The cottages and vent stack are classified by the National Trust of Australia (NSW) and with this group are likely to be held in high regard by members of the local community.

The place has potential to yield information that will contribute to an understanding of the cultural or natural history of New South Wales.

The cottages and sewer vent exhibit construction techniques and detailing, the quality of which is unlikely to be reproduced.

The vent is a prime strategic position for the function it plays in the maintenance and operation of the sewer main.

The place possesses uncommon, rare or endangered aspects of the cultural or natural history of New South Wales.

They are collectively as a pair, unique examples of their type of vent and cottages in Sydney Water's system and rare, if not unique in NSW.

The place is important in demonstrating the principal characteristics of a class of cultural or natural places/environments in New South Wales.

The cottages, albeit of a high quality, are representative of the Queen Anne style of architecture around the turn of the 20th century.

See also

References

Bibliography

Attribution 

New South Wales State Heritage Register
Marrickville, New South Wales
Sewerage infrastructure in Sydney
Houses in New South Wales
Articles incorporating text from the New South Wales State Heritage Register
Queen Anne architecture in Australia